Helike (pronounced , modern ) was an ancient Greek polis (city-state) that was submerged by a tsunami in the winter of 373 BC. It was located in the regional unit of Achaea, northern Peloponnesos, two kilometres (12 stadia) from the Corinthian Gulf and near the city of Boura, which, like Helike, was a member of the Achaean League. Modern research attributes the catastrophe to an earthquake and accompanying tsunami which destroyed and submerged the city. In an effort to protect the site from destruction, the World Monuments Fund included Helike in its 2004 and 2006 List of 100 Most Endangered Sites.

History

Helike was founded in the Bronze Age, becoming the principal city of Achaea.  The poet Homer states that the city of Helike participated in the Trojan War as a part of Agamemnon's forces. Later, following its fall to the Achaeans, Helike led the Achaean League, an association that joined twelve neighboring cities in an area including today's town of Aigio. Helike was a small town with only 5,000 year-round residences, it became powerful due to its patron god Poseidon. Helike, also known as Dodekapolis (from the Greek words dodeka meaning twelve and polis meaning city), became a cultural and religious center with its own coinage. Finds from ancient Helike are limited to two fifth-century copper coins, now housed in Bode Museum, Berlin. The obverse shows the head of Poseidon, the city's patron, and the reverse his trident. There was a temple dedicated to the Helikonian Poseidon. Ancient Greeks would travel to Helike to be blessed by Posidon and to trade. 

Helike founded colonies including Priene in Asia Minor and Sybaris in Southern Italy. Its panhellenic temple and sanctuary of Helikonian Poseidon were known throughout the classical world, and second only in religious importance to Delphi.

Destruction
The destruction of Helike is now debated by many people in academia. There is a version that many ancient sources accept, but now because of science and technology, there is a new theory coming to light. The theory is that there was a earthquake that caused soil liquifaction and then mudslides. The mudslides and earthquake combined with a lot of rain that ended up flooding Helike. 
The ancient account of Helike's destruction in 373 BC, two years before the Battle of Leuctra, during a winter night. Several events were construed in retrospect as having warned of the disaster: some "immense columns of flame" appeared, and five days previously, all animals and vermin fled the city, going toward Keryneia. The city and a space of 12 stadia below it sank into the earth and were covered over by the sea. All the inhabitants perished without a trace, and the city was obscured from view except for a few building fragments projecting from the sea. Ten Spartan ships anchored in the harbour were dragged down with it. An attempt involving 2,000 men to recover bodies was unsuccessful. Aigion took possession of its territory.

The catastrophe was attributed to the vengeance of Poseidon, whose wrath was incited because the inhabitants of Helike had refused to give their statue of Poseidon to the Ionian colonists in Asia, or even to supply them with a model. According to some authorities, the inhabitants of Helike and Bura had even murdered the Ionian deputies.

About 150 years after the disaster, the philosopher Eratosthenes visited the site and reported that a standing bronze statue of Poseidon was submerged in a "poros", "holding in one hand a hippocamp", where it posed a hazard to those who fished with nets.

Around 174 AD, the traveler Pausanias visited a coastal site still called Helike, located seven kilometres southeast of Aigio, and reported that the walls of the ancient city were still visible under water, "but not so plainly now as they were once, because they are corroded by the salt water".

For centuries after, its submerged ruins could still be seen. Roman tourists frequently sailed over the site, admiring the city's statuary. Later the site silted over and the location was lost to memory.

 argued that the submergence of Helike might have inspired Plato to end his story about Atlantis with its submersion. Ancient scholars and writers who visited the ruins include the Greeks Strabo,  Pausanias and Diodoros of Sicily, and the Romans Aelian and Ovid.

Subsequent events
On 23 August 1817, a similar disaster, an earthquake followed by a tsunami, occurred on the same spot. The earthquake was preceded by a sudden explosion, like that produced by a battery of cannon. The aftershock was said to have lasted a minute and a half, during which the sea rose at the mouth of the Selinous River and extended to cover all the ground immediately below Vostitza (the ancient Aigion). After its retreat, not a trace was left of some artillery depots which had stood on the shore, and the beach was carried away completely. In Vostitza, 65 people lost their lives and two thirds of its buildings were entirely ruined, as were five villages in the plain.

Research efforts
The submerged town was long one of the biggest targets for underwater archaeology. Scientists were divided in their opinions about the exact location of Helike. Numerous archaeologists, historians, professors and explorers wrote, studied and actively searched, trying to discover any trace of the ancient town, with little success. But their work, essays, observations and studies contributed to an important and growing body of knowledge. Among them are the following:

In 1826, François Pouqueville, French diplomat and archaeologist, who wrote the Voyage en Grèce; in 1851 Ernst Curtius the German archaeologist and historian who speculated about its location; in 1879 J. F. Julius Schmidt, the director of Athens Observatory, issuing a study comparing the Aegeion earthquake which occurred 26 December 1861 with an earthquake which might have destroyed Helike; in 1883 Spiros Panagiotopoulos, the mayor of Aegeion city, wrote about the ancient city; in 1912 the Greek writer P. K. Ksinopoulos wrote The City of Aegeion Through the Centuries and in 1939 Stanley Casson, an English art scholar and army officer who studied classical archaeology and served in Greece as liaison officer, addressed the problem.

Other investigators include in 1948 the German archaeologist Georg Karo; in 1950 Robert Demangel, who was from 1933 to 1948 the director of the French School of Archaeology in Athens; in 1950 Alfred Philippson, German geologist and geographer; in 1952 Spiros Dontas, Greek writer and member of the Academy of Athens; in 1954 Aristos Stauropoulos, a Greek writer who published the History of the city of Aegeion; in 1956 the Greek Professor N. Κ. Moutsopoulos; in 1967 Spyros Marinatos, a Greek archaeologist who wrote the Research about Helike and in 1968 Helike-Thira-Thebes; in 1962 George K. Georgalas, the Greek writer; and in 1967 Nikos Papahatzis, a Greek archaeologist who published Pausanias’ Description of Greece.

Spyridon Marinatos, emphasizing the importance of the discovery of Helike, said that only the declaration of a third world war would obscure the discovery of Helike. He pointed out Helike as an unresolved problem of Greek archaeology in 1960. In 1967, Harold Eugene Edgerton worked with the American researcher Peter Throckmorton. They were convinced that Helike was to be found on the seabed of the Gulf of Corinth. Edgerton perfected special sonar equipment for this research but permission to search was not granted by the Greek authorities. In 1967 and in 1976, Jacques Cousteau made some efforts with no result. In 1979 in the Corinthian Gulf, the Greek undersea explorer Alexis Papadopoulos discovered a sunken town and recorded his findings in a documentary film which shows walls, fallen roofs, roof tiles, streets, etc. at a depth of between 25 and 45 m. "Whether or not this town can be identified with Helike is a question to be answered by extensive underwater research. In any case, the discovery of this town can be regarded as an extremely interesting find", according to the Greek scientific journal Archaeology.

Rediscovery
In 1988, the Greek archaeologist Dora Katsonopoulou, president of the Helike Society, and Steven Soter of the American Museum of Natural History launched the Helike Project to locate the site of the lost city. Ancient texts, telling the story of Helike, said that the city had sunk into a poros, which everyone interpreted as the Corinthian Gulf. However, Katsonopoulou and Soter raised the possibility that poros could have meant an inland lagoon. If an earthquake caused soil liquefaction on a large scale, the city would have been taken downward below the sea level. Also, if an earthquake caused the sections of coastline to fall into the sea, this would have created a tsunami, which in turn would have flooded the inland lagoon with the city in it. Over time, the river sediment coming down from the mountains would have filled in the lagoon hiding the city remains beneath the solid ground.

Before Helike was rediscovered, a few false starts came along the way. In 1994, in collaboration with the University of Patras, a magnetometer survey carried out in the midplain of the delta revealed the outlines of a buried building. This target (now known as the Klonis site) was excavated and a large Roman building with standing walls was found. Also a well-preserved settlement of the early Bronze Age was uncovered. Finally, in 2001, the city of Helike was rediscovered buried in an ancient lagoon near the village of Rizomylos. To further confirm that the discovered site belongs to Helike, the earthquake destruction layer consisting of cobblestones, clay roof tiles, and pottery was uncovered in 2012. This destruction layer is in good agreement with ancient texts on the location of Helike and earthquake effects to the city.

Excavations are being carried out in the Helike delta each summer and have brought to light significant archeological finds dating from prehistoric times when Helike was founded up until its revival in Hellenistic and Roman times.

See also
 List of ancient Greek cities
 Heracleion

References

External links

Official Website of Helike Project
The bronze coin of Helike at the Münzkabinett of the Staatliche Museen zu Berlin

Cities in ancient Peloponnese
Achaean city-states
Submerged places
Underwater ruins
Archaeological sites in Western Greece
Populated places in ancient Achaea
Former populated places in Greece
2001 archaeological discoveries
Ancient Greek archaeological sites in Greece
Cities in ancient Greece
Cities destroyed by earthquakes
Locations in the Iliad
4th-century BC disestablishments in Greece
States and territories disestablished in the 4th century BC